Abel Delos Streight (June 17, 1828 – May 27, 1892) was a peacetime lumber merchant and publisher, and was a Union Army colonel in the American Civil War. His command precipitated a notable cavalry raid in 1863, known as Streight's Raid. He was a prisoner of war for 10 months. On March 12, 1866, his nomination for appointment to the grade of brevet brigadier general, to rank from March 13, 1865 was confirmed. He later became a politician, and served as a state senator in Indiana for two terms.

Early life and Civil War
Abel Streight was born in Wheeler, New York, son of Asa Streight and Lydia Spaulding Streight. On 14 Jan 1849 he married Lavina or Lovina McCarty, who was born 1830, Bath Twp., Steuben Co., NY and died 5 Jun 1910, Marion Co., IN. He moved to Cincinnati, as a young man, and by 1859 was living in Indianapolis, where he was a publisher of books and maps.

Streight was appointed colonel of the 51st Indiana Infantry regiment on December 12, 1861. His regiment was soon attached to the Union Army of the Cumberland.

Streight and his regiment saw very limited action during the first two years of their service, which is said to have disappointed him greatly.

In 1863, he proposed a plan to Brig. Gen. James A. Garfield (chief of staff of the Army of the Cumberland) that he be allowed to raise a force to make a raid deeply into the South. His proposal was to disrupt the Western & Atlantic Railroad from Chattanooga to Atlanta, which carried supplies to the Confederate Army of Tennessee. The Union Army's commander, William S. Rosecrans, gave him permission.

Union forces from Streight's own 51st Indiana, 73rd Indiana Infantry, 80th Illinois Infantry, and 3rd Ohio Infantry regiments were placed under Streight's command. This force encompassed approximately 1,700 troops. The original intent was to have this force mounted suitably for fast travel and attacks; however, due largely to wartime shortages, Streight's brigade were equipped with mules. This obvious disadvantage, combined with Streight's own inexperience, was to prove disastrous.

Streight led this force to Nashville, departed Tuscumbia, Alabama, on April 26, 1863, and then to Eastport, Mississippi. From there he decided to push to the southeast, initially screened by another Union force commanded by Brig. Gen. Grenville Dodge. On April 30, Streight's brigade arrived at Sand Mountain, where he was intercepted by a Confederate cavalry force under Brig. Gen. Nathan Bedford Forrest and harassed for several days. Streight's force won the Battle of Day's Gap but the battle set off a series of skirmishes that eventually led the Union forces being surrounded and captured. Streight himself was captured at Cedar Bluff, Alabama on May 3, 1863, and taken to Libby Prison as a prisoner of war.

Lovina McCarthy Streight and the couple's five-year-old son accompanied the 51st into the South with Lovina acting as a nurse for the regiment. The soldiers dubbed her "The Mother of the 51st" for her contributions. Lovina was captured three times by Confederate soldiers. Twice she was exchanged in return for prisoners of war. The third time she escaped using a gun she had hidden under her skirts.

On February 9, 1864, after ten months of incarceration, Streight and 107 other soldiers escaped from Libby Prison by tunnelling from their barracks to freedom. Eventually, Streight was able to cross through enemy territory and, on his return, gave a debriefing report to his Union commanders.

Eventually Streight was restored to active duty being placed in command of the 1st Brigade, 3rd Division, IV Corps.  He participated in the battles of Franklin and Nashville.  Streight resigned from the army on March 16, 1865.

On January 13, 1866, President Andrew Johnson nominated Streight for appointment to the grade of brevet brigadier general of volunteers, to rank from March 13, 1865, and the United States Senate confirmed the appointment on March 12, 1866.

Postbellum career

In 1866, Streight and his wife built a house on 4121 East Washington Street in Indianapolis. In 1876, Streight ran successfully for a seat in the Indiana Senate, serving a two-year term. In 1880, he ran unsuccessfully as the Republican candidate for governor of Indiana. In 1888, he was once again elected as State Senator. He died in Indianapolis four years later, in 1892, from complications of Bright's Disease. Although initially buried on the front lawn of his residence, his grave was eventually moved in 1902 to Crown Hill Cemetery. The grave includes a bronze bust of the general.

Streight was the author of The Crisis of Eighteen Hundred and Sixty-one in the Government of the United States, published in 1861.

Streight's wife Lovina joined her husband on his southern campaign, often ministering help to wounded men during the battle. She was captured three times and exchanged for prisoners.  When Abel died in 1892 she had him buried in the front yard of their home, stating, "I never knew where he was in life, but now I can find him." Lovina Streight was known as the "Mother of the 51st", and upon her death in 1910, her funeral was afforded full military honors. It was said at the time that her funeral drew the largest crowd of mourners to Crown Hill Cemetery in Indianapolis since the funeral of President Benjamin Harrison. In her will, she directed that the family mansion should become a home for aged women; however, relatives successfully challenged the will on the grounds that she was of “unsound mind.” The main arguments used by the plaintiffs were that she believed in spiritualism and was under the influence of B. Frank Schmid, a spiritualist.

See also

List of American Civil War brevet generals (Union)

Notes

References
Eicher, David J., The Longest Night: A Military History of the Civil War, Simon & Schuster, 2001, .
Eicher, John H., and Eicher, David J., Civil War High Commands, Stanford University Press, 2001, .

External links
 
Review of book about Streight
Report by Streight following his raid

                  

1828 births
1892 deaths
Union Army colonels
People of Indiana in the American Civil War
American Civil War prisoners of war
The Lightning Mule Brigade
Burials at Crown Hill Cemetery
People from Wheeler, New York
Republican Party Indiana state senators
Military personnel from New York (state)
Deaths from kidney disease
19th-century American politicians